Air Africa was an airline based in Kahemba Airport, Zaire. The airline started flights in 1991 with a few destinations, operated by Moscow Airways, but closed in 1996 after the 1996 Air Africa crash.

Fleet

Destinations
N'Dolo Airport
Kahemba Airport

Accident
On 8 January 1996, an Air Africa Antonov An-32 aircraft (RA-26222) which had been wet-leased by Moscow Airways to Scibe Airlift crashed into a market shortly after taking off from N'Dolo Airport in Kinshasa, capital of the Democratic Republic of the Congo, killing approximately 300 people (see 1996 Air Africa crash).  At the time, the Russian Ministry of Transport had "suspended or withdrawn" Moscow Airways' air operator's license.

References

 
1991 establishments in Zaire
Airlines established in 1991
1996 disestablishments in Africa
Airlines disestablished in 1996
Defunct airlines of the Democratic Republic of the Congo